Crane Valley is a   Local Nature Reserve in Cranbrook in Kent. It is owned and managed by Tunbridge Wells Borough Council.

Much of this site is wet woodland with lush vegetation, including the locally rare large bitter-cress. There is semi-natural woodland in drier areas, with oak, hornbeam and field maple.

There is access from the park north-east of the site.

References

Local Nature Reserves in Kent